María del Pilar Primo de Rivera y Sáenz de Heredia, 1st Countess of the Castle of La Mota (4 November 1907 – 17 March 1991) was the sister of José Antonio Primo de Rivera, founder of the Falange, a political movement of Spain, and the daughter of Spanish dictator General Miguel Primo de Rivera, 2nd Marquis of Estella.

She was an enthusiastic member of the Falange, heading its Sección Femenina ("Women's Section"). Unlike two of her brothers (both put to death by the Republicans), she survived the Spanish Civil War, during which she met Adolf Hitler, Benito Mussolini, and Antonio Salazar. She attempted to prevent reprisals being taken against the widows of Republican militants, and supported the ascent of King Juan Carlos I in 1975, but was disappointed when the paternalist system – the Spanish State – was dismantled during the Spanish transition to democracy.

Pilar became president of the Association of Sección Femenina Veterans in November 1977, and held the post until her death. The main seat of the association was at the Castle of La Mota.

In addition to her political duties, Pilar carried out a good deal of work compiling numerous different forms of Spanish folklore, specially in the fields of regional music and dances.

She never married. Fascist pioneer Ernesto Giménez Caballero conceived the idea of arranging a marriage between her and Adolf Hitler, but this plan never came to fruition. Primo de Rivera commented in her memoirs that she would have not accepted because of personal reasons but the idea made her feel flattered.

Genealogy

References

Citations

Bibliography
 

1907 births
1991 deaths
Francoist Spain
Spanish Falangists
Spanish Roman Catholics
Spanish anti-communists
Spanish countesses
Place of birth missing
Pilar
20th-century Spanish women politicians